This is a list of new beat musicians.

List

Q'pNz (revival)
Xerosorex (revival)
Shimanski Beats (revival)
Jack Matthew Tyson (revival)
Köner (revival)
1788-L 
Rezz

Boys From Brazil
T99 (Phil Wilde)
LA Style
Public Relation
Rhythm Device
Taste of Sugar
Bizz Nizz
Amnesia
Patrick De Meyer
Fatal Morgana
In-D
Sir G (Serge Ramaekers)
Egma
Magic Matze
Nostromo Dept.
Public Relation
Confettis
Novelty song "Qui...?"" (1989) by Brussels Sound Revolution, sampling parts of a press conference speech by former Prime Minister Paul Vanden Boeynants after he was kidnapped by the gang of Patrick Haemers.
Twenty 4 Seven
Technotronic
Snap!
Joey Beltram
Praga Khan
Lords of Acid

Historic record labels and venues associated with new beat
 Ancienne Belgique (AB), an Antwerp nightclub.
 Antler-Subway Records, launched by Maurice Engelen (of Praga Khan).
 Boccaccio, a night-club.
 R&S Records, launched by Renaat Vandepapeliere and his wife.

References

New
Electronic body music